Stemmatophora brunnealis is a moth of the  family Pyralidae. It is found in Southern Europe and North Africa.

Moths described in 1829
Pyralini
Moths of Europe
Moths of Africa